Bhutanillus is a genus of ground beetles in the family Carabidae. There are at least two described species in Bhutanillus.

Species
These two species belong to the genus Bhutanillus:
 Bhutanillus pygmaeus M.E.Schmid, 1975
 Bhutanillus yodai (Jedlicka, 1965)

References

Trechinae